James Andrew Musick (May 5, 1910 – December 15, 1992) was an American football fullback in the National Football League (NFL) for the Boston Braves/Redskins from 1932 to 1936 and the Sheriff of Orange County, California from 1947 to 1975.  He led the NFL in rushing in 1933.

Early life and college career
Jim Musick was born May 5, 1910, in Kirksville, Missouri to a family of some notoriety. Other famous relatives include authors John R. Musick and Ruth Ann Musick, as well as painter Archie Musick. His family moved to Southern California when Jim was a young boy. After attending Santa Ana High School, Musick played college football at the University of Southern California (USC) from 1929 to 1931.

It was at USC he earned the nickname "Sweet" Musick as he helped lead the Trojans to two Rose Bowl victories and a national championship in 1931. Musick had 393 carries for 1,605 yards at USC. While at USC Musick even had a brief flirtation with Hollywood, having an uncredited role along with fellow Trojan players and former player John Wayne in the 1932 movie That's My Boy.

Professional career
After graduation from USC in 1932, Musick signed with the Boston Redskins (now the Washington Redskins) where he would play for four seasons. Musick led the NFL in rushing in 1933 with 173 carries for 809 yards, an average of 4.7 yards per carry, along with five touchdowns. For these accomplishments he was named to the 1933 NFL All-Star Team. Musick returned to the Redskins in 1935 only to suffer a season-ending knee injury three weeks into the season. In a bid to earn new contract with more money, Musick refused to report for training camp in 1936. The Redskins would not give into the demands and waived Musick. Picked up off waivers by the Green Bay Packers in 1937 Musick prepared to report for training camp however he reinjured the knee while playing badminton two weeks prior to camp, effectively ending his NFL career.

Sheriff's Deputy
While still a professional football player, Jim Musick began working in the offseason as a deputy for the Orange County Sheriff's Department, which was headquartered in his hometown of Santa Ana, California. After retirement from the NFL, Musick took up law enforcement full-time, except for a period during World War II when he served as a US Marine officer.

Sheriff of Orange County, California
In 1946, Musick won election to the first of seven consecutive terms as Orange County Sheriff, remaining at the post until deciding not to seek re-election in 1974.

Musick died December 15, 1992, at a nursing home in his hometown of Santa Ana, California.

Honors
 Named to the 1933 National Football League All-Star team.
 Inducted into the Orange County Sports Hall of Fame in 1986.
 The James A. Musick Facility, part of the Orange County Sheriff's Department, is named for him.
 2017 La Cita member/guest champion

References

External links
 
 
 

1910 births
1992 deaths
20th-century American politicians
American football fullbacks
Boston Braves (NFL) players
Boston Redskins players
California sheriffs
USC Trojans football players
People from Kirksville, Missouri
Sportspeople from Santa Ana, California
Players of American football from California
United States Marine Corps officers
United States Marine Corps personnel of World War II
Military personnel from California